William Ashton was launched at Lancaster in 1810 as a West Indiaman. In 1810 she repelled a French privateer in a single ship action, and in 1813 she captured a ship. Then in 1818–1819 she made one voyage to India, sailing under a licence from the British East India Company (EIC). Thereafter she traded widely until she was wrecked on 9 August 1830 at Newfoundland on her way from Dublin to Quebec.

Career
William Ashton first appeared in Lloyd's Register (LR), in 1810.

Captain Thomas Greenwood's previous command had been the Lancaster-built West Indiaman .

On 22 August 1810, a French privateer with yellow sides, 20 guns, and full of men approached William Ashton as v was on her way back to England from St Croix. The two vessels exchanged fire for two hours, at times firing from within 40 yards of each other. Greenwood several times filled bottles with small shot and shot that at the French vessel, possibly causing heavy casualties. Eventually, the privateer sailed off. William Ashton was much damaged in her masts and rigging, and had taken several shot between "wind and water".

Captain Thomas Greenwood acquired a letter of marque on 22 September 1810, shortly after arriving back at Lancaster after this action. However, a month later, on 25 October, Captain Thomas Dawson took command of William Ashton and acquired his own letter of marque.

On 13 April 1813, William Dawson, William Ashton, and Mary captured the American schooner Miranda, which was on her way from Kennebunk to Cuba. The three British ships were coming from St Croix.

On 20 May 1816 William Ashton, Keen, master, arrived at St Johns, New Brunswick, from Jamaica. She had lost two bower anchors when she ran ashore at Shelburne, Nova Scotia. On 8 September she filled with water after she  struck on the Coal Rock as she was coming into Liverpool from St John, New Brunswick. 

In 1813 the EIC had lost its monopoly on the trade between India and Britain. British ships were then free to sail to India or the Indian Ocean under a licence from the EIC.  

William Ashton, Brown, master, sailed in April 1818 for Bengal. On 30 September she was at Bengal. On 3 March 1819 she sailed for Liverpool. 

The rock was given the name "Ashton Rock" in contemporary nautical guides. However, the rock did not exist. There were no later confirmatory sightings and in five days of searching in 1850 Lieutenant J. C. Walsh, in the U. S. schooner Taney, could not find the rock. He reported his lack of success to Lieutenant Matthew Fontaine Maury. Later, "Ashton Rock" was included on a list of rocks and the like that had been reported but did not exist.

Fate
On 9 August 1830, William Ashton was on her way from Dublin to Quebec when she struck a rock in Fortune Bay, Newfoundland during a fog and quickly filled with water. The crew and passengers  were able to reach Harbour Briton. 

William Ashton was no longer listed in the 1830 volume of Lloyd's Register.

Notes

Citations

References
 
  
 
 

1810 ships
Age of Sail merchant ships of England
Maritime incidents in August 1830